Lynn Carlton Higby (August 6, 1938 – February 10, 1992) was a United States district judge of the United States District Court for the Northern District of Florida.

Education and career
Born in Orlando, Florida, Higby received a Bachelor of Arts degree from Emory University in 1960 and a Bachelor of Laws from Emory University School of Law in 1962. He was in private practice in Atlanta, Georgia in 1962, and was then, in the United States Navy Reserve from 1962 to 1965, returning to private practice in Panama City, Florida from 1965 to 1979.

Federal judicial service
On June 14, 1979, Higby was nominated by President Jimmy Carter to a new seat on the United States District Court for the Northern District of Florida created by 92 Stat. 1629. He was confirmed by the United States Senate on October 4, 1979, and received his commission on October 5, 1979. Higby served in that capacity until his resignation from the bench on January 3, 1983. Higby died on February 10, 1992, in Pensacola, Florida.

References

Sources
 

People from Orlando, Florida
People from Panama City, Florida
Military personnel from Florida
Emory University alumni
Emory University School of Law alumni
Florida lawyers
Georgia (U.S. state) lawyers
Judges of the United States District Court for the Northern District of Florida
United States district court judges appointed by Jimmy Carter
20th-century American judges
1938 births
1992 deaths
United States Navy reservists